Lyudmyla and Nadiya Kichenok were the defending champions, but chose instead to compete at the Al Habtoor Tennis Challenge.

Jeļena Ostapenko and Eva Paalma won the tournament, defeating Quirine Lemoine and Martina Přádová in the final, 6–2, 5–7, [11–9].

Seeds

Draw

References 
 Draw

Orto-Laakarit Open - Doubles
2013 WD